The 1994 Lowen Sport European League was a  professional non-ranking snooker tournament that was played from 1 January to 29 May 1994.

Stephen Hendry won in the final 10–7 against John Parrott. 


League phase

Top four qualified for the play-offs. If points were level then most frames won determined their positions. If two players had an identical record then the result in their match determined their positions. If that ended 4–4 then the player who got to four first was higher.

 John Parrott 5–3 Steve Davis
 Ronnie O'Sullivan 6–2 Jimmy White
 John Parrott 6–2 Ronnie O'Sullivan
 Jimmy White 5–3 Stephen Hendry
 Alan McManus 5–3 Ronnie O'Sullivan
 Stephen Hendry 7–1 Steve Davis
 Alan McManus 6–2 Jimmy White
 Steve Davis 7–1 Sascha Diemer
 John Parrott 5–3 Stephen Hendry
 Sascha Diemer 6–2 Mario Wehrmann
 John Parrott 7–1 Allison Fisher
 Alan McManus 7–1 Robert Burda

 Jimmy White 5–3 Steve Davis
 John Parrott 6–2 Jimmy White
 Alan McManus 4–4 Stephen Hendry
 John Parrott 6–2 Mario Wehrmann
 Ronnie O'Sullivan 6–2 Robert Burda
 Allison Fisher 6–2 Sascha Diemer
 Stephen Hendry 8–0 Mario Wehrmann
 Alan McManus 5–3 John Parrott
 Steve Davis 7–1 Allison Fisher
 Ronnie O'Sullivan 6–2 Sascha Diemer
 Mario Wehrmann 7–1 Robert Burda

 Stephen Hendry 6–2 Allison Fisher
 Steve Davis 5–3 Ronnie O'Sullivan
 Robert Burda 4–4 Allison Fisher
 Alan McManus 7–1 Sascha Diemer
 Jimmy White 6–2 Robert Burda
 Ronnie O'Sullivan 4–4 Mario Wehrmann
 Robert Burda 7–1 Sascha Diemer
 Alan McManus 5–3 Steve Davis
 Allison Fisher 4–4 Jimmy White
 Stephen Hendry 7–1 Sascha Diemer
 Allison Fisher 5–3 Mario Wehrmann

 Stephen Hendry 7–1 Robert Burda
 John Parrott 7–1 Sascha Diemer
 Alan McManus 7–1 Mario Wehrmann
 Ronnie O'Sullivan 5–3 Allison Fisher
 Alan McManus 4–4 Allison Fisher
 Stephen Hendry 7–1 Ronnie O'Sullivan
 John Parrott 5–3 Robert Burda
 Jimmy White 5–3 Mario Wehrmann
 Steve Davis 7–1 Robert Burda
 Jimmy White 5–3 Sascha Diemer
 Steve Davis 5–3 Mario Wehrmann

Play-offs 
28–29 May (Atlantis Hotel, Bingen am Rhein, Germany)

References

Premier League Snooker
1994 in snooker
1994 in British sport